Luis Molina (October 11, 1938 – April 20, 2013) was an American boxer. He competed in the lightweight event at the 1956 Summer Olympics.

References

1938 births
2013 deaths
Lightweight boxers
Boxers from California
American male boxers
Olympic boxers of the United States
Boxers at the 1956 Summer Olympics
Sportspeople from Santa Barbara, California